James Dermot Kelly (21 April 1917 – 25 November 2004) was an Irish sports shooter. He competed at the 1968 Summer Olympics and the 1972 Summer Olympics.

References

1917 births
2004 deaths
Irish male sport shooters
Olympic shooters of Ireland
Shooters at the 1968 Summer Olympics
Shooters at the 1972 Summer Olympics
People from County Kildare